Percy Ford (15 March 1888 in Chicago, Illinois – 8 March 1962 in Kansas City, Missouri) was an American racecar driver.

Indy 500 results

References

Indianapolis 500 drivers
1888 births
1962 deaths
Racing drivers from Chicago